United For Peace is the second video album and the tenth overall album by the Pakistani band, Junoon. The album contains four music videos from Junoon's previous albums, which include Azadi, theme from Jinnah the Movie, Bulleya from Parvaaz, Jazba-e-Junoon from Inquilaab, and Zamane Ke Andaz from Andaz.

Track listing
All music listed below is written and composed by Salman Ahmad, Ali Azmat, and Sabir Zafar, unless stated otherwise.

Personnel
All information is taken from the CD.

Junoon
Salman Ahmad - vocals, lead guitar
Ali Azmat - vocals, backing vocals
Brian O'Connell - bass guitar, backing vocals

Additional musicians
Female Vocals on "Azadi" by Samina Ahmad

Production
Produced by Salman Ahmad

External links
 Junoon's Official Website

Junoon (band) video albums

2001 video albums
2001 compilation albums
Music video compilation albums
Urdu-language albums